The short-tailed babbler (Pellorneum malaccense) is a species of bird in the family Pellorneidae.It is found in Peninsular Malaysia, Singapore, and Thailand as well as the islands of Sumatra and Borneo (and some of the smaller surrounding islands).

Its natural habitat is tropical moist lowland forests. The species is generally solitary, not joining larger mixed-species flocks, instead foraging as singles or pairs. They forage in the understory on the ground on a variety of insects including beetles, grasshoppers, and ants. Like other babblers they will use their foot to grasp food items, an unusual behaviour for passerine birds.

The short-tailed babbler is locally common at a number of places within its range but is considered near-threatened due to the loss of lowland forest in its range.

There are three subspecies:

 P. m. malaccense (Hartlaub, 1844) – Malay Peninsula and nearby islands, Sumatra and nearby islands, Natuna Islands
 P. m. saturatum (Robinson & Kloss, 1920) –  Bangka Belitung Islands, west and southwest Borneo
 P. m. poliogene (Strickland, 1849) – north and east Borneo

References

Collar, N. J. & Robson, C. 2007. Family Timaliidae (Babblers)  pp. 70 – 291 in; del Hoyo, J., Elliott, A. & Christie, D.A. eds. Handbook of the Birds of the World, Vol. 12. Picathartes to Tits and Chickadees. Lynx Edicions, Barcelona.

short-tailed babbler
Birds of Malesia
short-tailed babbler
Taxonomy articles created by Polbot
Taxobox binomials not recognized by IUCN